PMPC Star Awards for Television is an annual award-giving body recognizing the outstanding programming produced by the several TV networks in the Philippines.

It was founded by the Philippine Movie Press Club, an organization of tabloid reporters, in 1987.

The PMPC Star Awards for Television is generally held in October (1987–2004, 2006, 2016, 2018–2019 and 2021), November (2007–2014 and 2017) and/or December (2005 and 2015). But due to the awarding event skips the 4th quarter of a previous year, It is held on January (2023). They are seen in rotation among the television channels such as ABS-CBN 2 (1988–1989 and 2009–2019), TV5 (2008), RPN 9 (1987, 2000-2004 and 2006–2007), IBC 13 (1990–1999 and 2005) and STV (2021).

Ceremonies

Categories

Programming
Best Children Show (not given in 2005 and 2016-2017)
Best Educational Program (not given in 1998)
Best Lifestyle Show (since 2001)
Best Travel Show (since 2006)
Best Morning Show (since 1999)
Best Public Affairs Program
Best Magazine Show
Best Documentary Program
Best Public Service Program (not given in 1998)
Best News Program
Best Talent Search Program (since 2004; not given in 2018) [or Best Talent Show since 1987 to early 1990s]
Best Comedy Show
Best Celebrity Talk Show
Best Variety Show (not given in 2015)
Best Musical Variety Show
Best Drama Series [a single category] (1987–2003, 2012)
Best Primetime Drama Series (2004–2011, 2013 to present)
Best Daytime Drama Series (2004–2011, 2013 to present)
Best Drama Mini-Series (1992, 1998, 2000-2002, 2009–2011, 2015)
Best Drama Anthology (since 1992)
Best Horror / Fantasy Program (2000-2013, 2017 to present)

Performing

List of PMPC Star Awards for TV's Multi-Award Winning Performers & Personalities

Best Travel Show Host (since 2006)
Best Children Show Host (not given in 2005, 2016 and 2017)
Best Educational Program Host (not given in 1998)
Best Lifestyle Show Host (since 2001)
Best Morning Show Host (since 1999)
Best Public Service Program Host (not given in 1998)
Best Public Affairs Program Host
Best Magazine Show Host
Best Documentary Program Host
Best Talent Search Program Host (since 2004) [or Best Talent Show Host since 1987 to early 1990s]
Best Celebrity Talk Show Host
Best Male TV Host
Best Female TV Host
Best Male Newscaster
Best Female Newscaster
Best Comedy Actor
Best Comedy Actress
Best Drama Actor
Best Drama Actress
Best Drama Supporting Actor (Since 2013)
Best Drama Supporting Actress (Since 2013)
Best Child Performer (Since 2012)
Best Single Performance by an Actor
Best Single Performance by an Actress
Best New TV Personality {a single category} (1987-1999, not given in 1988 which is "Most Promising TV Personality" a special award and 1989)
Best New Male TV Personality(2000 to present)
Best New Female TV Personality(2000 to present)

Merged Categories
Best Educational & Children Program (2012)
Best Reality & Game Show (2012)
Best Lifestyle & Travel Show (2012)
Best Educational & Children Program Host (2012)
Best Reality & Game Show Host (2012)
Best Lifestyle & Travel Show Host (2012)
Best Variety & Game Show (2009–2010)
Best Comedy & Gag Show (2012)
Best Celebrity & Showbiz-Oriented Talk Show (2012)
Best Musical & Variety Show (2012)
Best Male Celebrity & Showbiz-Oriented Show Host (2012)
Best Female Celebrity & Showbiz-Oriented Show Host (2012)

Best TV Station
Winner of this category comes from the lists below:
ABS-CBN - 1992, 1995^, 1996, 1999, 2003, 2004, 2007, 2009, 2010, 2011, 2012, 2013^, 2014, 2015, 2016, 2017, 2018, 2019, 2020
GMA Network - 1987, 1988, 1989, 1990, 1991, 1993, 1994, 1995^, 1997, 1998, 2000, 2001, 2002, 2005, 2006, 2008, 2013^, 2021, 2022
^ - In 1995 and 2013, ABS-CBN & GMA tied as Best TV Stations.

Special Awards

Male Face of the Night
Female Face of the Night
Male Star of the Night
Female Star of the Night
Male Celebrity of the Night
Female Celebrity of the Night
Ading Fernando Lifetime Achievement Award
Excellence In Broadcasting Lifetime Achievement Award
German Moreno's Power Tandem Award (2014)

Hall Of Fame
This will be given to a show and an artist (which is one category) that won their respective category, 15 times.

2009: Eat Bulaga! (Best Variety Show) (GMA Network formerly aired on RPN 9 & ABS-CBN)
2011: Boy Abunda (Best Male Showbiz-Oriented Show Host) (ABS-CBN)
2011: Maalaala Mo Kaya (Best Drama Anthology) (ABS-CBN)
2014: Bubble Gang (Best Gag Show) (GMA Network)
2018: ASAP (Best Musical Variety Show) (ABS-CBN)

Notes:

 Boy Abunda was awarded Hall of Famer for being "Best Male Showbiz-Oriented Show Host" in 2011, but he still nominated on his other categories which are "Best Celebrity Talk Show Host" and "Best Public Affairs Program Host" as of now.

Former or Inactive Categories
Best Music Video (the only award went to Lupang Hinirang [PTV 4] for winning their Best Music Video in 1999)
Best Sports Oriented Show
Best TV/Musical Special (until 2003 and replaced of Best Documentary Special in 2004)
Best TV Station ID (the only award went to PTV 4 for winning their Best TV Station ID in 1996)
Best TV Station w/ Balanced Programming (in 2000, it became and shortened as Best TV Station category)
Best Movie Talk Show & Host (replaced by Best Showbiz-Oriented Show & Host in the early 90s)
Best Woman Show & Host (in late 80s to mid-90s & also 2004 as "Best Woman-Oriented Program & Host")
Best Cooking Show & Host (in early 1990s)
Best Weekly Daytime Drama Series (in 2007, "Love Spell" [ABS-CBN 2]).
Best Cultural Magazine Show & Host (in early 90s until replaced by "Best Travel Show & Host" & "Best Lifestyle Program & Host")
Best Movie for TV (in early 90s to early 2000s)
Best Musical Program & Host (in late 1980s to mid-1990s)
Best Drama Serial & Best Drama Special (replaced of Best Drama Anthology since 1992)
Best Youth-Oriented Program (1997 to 2014)
Best Showbiz-Oriented Show (1990-2015, except 2012)
Best Showbiz-Oriented Show Host (1990-1999)
Best Female Showbiz-Oriented Show Host (2000-2015, except 2012)
Best Male Showbiz-Oriented Show Host (2000-2015, except 2012)
Best Reality Program [or Best Reality Based Competition TV Program] (2004-2015, except 2011-2012)
Best Reality Program Host (2004-2015, except 2011-2012)
Best Game Show (1988-2017, except 1991, 1998, 2009-2010 and 2012)
Best Game Show Host (1988-2017, except 1991, 1998 and 2012)
Best Gag Show (1990-2018, except 2012)
Best Documentary Special (2004-2019, except 2006)
Best Child Performer (2012-2020)

See also
 Star Awards for Movies
 List of Asian television awards
 Golden Screen TV Awards

References

External links

Awards established in 1987
1987 establishments in the Philippines
 
Philippine television awards
Award ceremonies in the Philippines